Season twenty-one of the television program American Experience originally aired on the PBS network in the United States on January 26, 2009 and concluded on May 11, 2009.  The season contained nine new episodes and began with the film The Trials of J. Robert Oppenheimer.

Episodes

References

2009 American television seasons
American Experience